The Prinsengracht is a -long canal that runs parallel to the Keizersgracht in the center of Amsterdam. The canal, named after the Prince of Orange, is the fourth of the four main canals belonging to the canal belt.

History

Construction started in 1612 on the initiative of Mayor Frans Hendricksz. Oetgens, after a design by city carpenter Hendrick Jacobsz Staets and city surveyor Lucas Jansz Sinck.

The part between the Leidsegracht and the Amstel was developed during the city explanation of 1658. 
The section to the east of the Amstel was constructed during the last expansion. 
This part was named Nieuwe Prinsengracht.

The Korte Prinsengracht is in the extension of the Prinsengracht between the Brouwersgracht and the Westerdok.

Architecture and monuments 

There are many monuments and monumental canal houses on the Prinsengracht, including:
 A crow-stepped gable on the corner with the Brouwersgracht at Prinsengracht 2–4.
 The van Brienenhofje, or Rk. St Van Brienens Founded The Star at Prinsengracht 89–133.
 A frame facade at Prinsengracht 124.
 't Casteel van Beveren from around 1720 at Prinsengracht 299.
 The Anne Frank House from 1635 with the Secret Annex from 1740 at Prinsengracht 263 (near the Westertoren).
 'De Roode Vos' with a clock gable at Prinsengracht 300.
 The Palace of Justice from 1829 at Prinsengracht 436.
 A typical example of a 19th-century so-called Ojief spout facade at Prinsengracht 556.
 The Prinsengracht Hospital at Prinsengracht 769.
 The best-preserved copy of five identical neck gables from 1701 at Prinsengracht 849.
 The 17th-century Deutzen Hofje at Prinsengracht 899.

Churches 
Between Prinsengracht 16 and 18 - at Westerstraat - there is the Noordermarkt with the Noorderkerk built around 1623.
The Westerkerk with the Westertoren on Prinsengracht 281 (on the Westermarkt).
Between Prinsengracht 1047 and 1049 - at the Utrechtsestraat - there is the Amstelveld with the special Amstelkerk, built as a temporary ‘Wooden barn’ in 1670.
Prinsengracht 756 contains the De Duif church building from 1858. (Until 1974 it was the Catholic Sint-Willibrorduskerk within the Veste.)

Numbering and orientation 
The Prinsengracht starts in the north at the Brouwersgracht, bends parallel to the Keizersgracht to the southeast and flows into the Amstel. 
The odd numbered side of the canal is on the side of the heart of the city (Dam Square).

At Prinsengracht 182 and 281 is the intersection with Rozengracht and Raadhuisstraat respectively
At Prinsengracht 444 and 707 you will find the intersection with Leidsestraat (Filmtheater de Uitkijk is at number 452)
At Prinsengracht 644 and 927 is the intersection with Vijzelgracht and Vijzelstraat respectively
At Prinsengracht 806 and 1055 is the intersection with Utrechtsestraat
To the east of the Prinsengracht, between the Raadhuisstraat and the Leidsegracht are the so-called Negen Straatjes (Nine Small Streets).

Bridges 
The Prinsengracht is spanned by 14 bridges, all fixed:

Trivia 
Other cities, such as Hasselt and Meppel, also have a Prinsengracht. The (filled-in) Prinsegracht (without N) is located in The Hague.
Since 1981 the Prinsengrachtconcert has been held annually in August on a pontoon in front of Hotel Pulitzer.
In the Dutch comedy series Het Zonnetje in Huis, the main café of main character Piet Bovenkerk, Café Vijf Bier, is located on the Prinsengracht.

See also 
Canals of Amsterdam

Notes

Canals in Amsterdam